The Journal of Advanced Nursing (also known as JAN) is a monthly peer-reviewed medical journal covering all aspects of nursing. It is published by John Wiley & Sons. JAN is a world-leading international peer reviewed journal. JAN targets readers who are committed to advancing practice and professional development on the basis of new knowledge and evidence. .

History
The journal was established in 1976 with James P. Smith as founding editor-in-chief. Subsequent editors-in-chief were Jane Robinson, Alison J. Tierney and Roger Watson. The current editor-in-chief is Debra Jackson (University of Sydney).

Abstracting and indexing
The journal is abstracted and indexed in:

According to the Journal Citation Reports, the journal has a 2019 impact factor of 2.376.

References

External links

Publications established in 1976
General nursing journals
Wiley (publisher) academic journals
Monthly journals
English-language journals